Ancient Dynasty is an album by American pianist Joanne Brackeen recorded in New York City and released on the Tappan Zee label in 1980.

Reception 

AllMusic reviewer Scott Yanow stated "This now out-of-print album features Brackeen with an all-star quartet featuring her former boss, Joe Henderson, on tenor, bassist Eddie Gomez and drummer Jack DeJohnette. The four complex Brackeen originals are all at least nine minutes long and are quite challenging for both the musicians and the listener alike".

Track listing 
All compositions by Joanne Brackeen.

 "Ancient Dynasty" – 11:16
 "Remembering" – 10:11
 "Beagle's Boogie" – 10:38
 "Pin Drum Song – Celebration" – 9:18

Personnel 
Joanne Brackeen – piano
Joe Henderson – tenor saxophone
Eddie Gómez – bass
Jack DeJohnette – drums

References 

Joanne Brackeen albums
1980 albums